Carina Alves Nogueira (born 19 November 1982) is a Luxembourger former footballer who played as a defender. She has also been a member of the Luxembourg women's national team.

References

1982 births
Living people
Women's association football defenders
Luxembourgian women's footballers
Luxembourg women's international footballers
Luxembourgian people of Portuguese descent